Maria Gimena Blanco (born 5 December 1987), known as Gimena Blanco, is an Argentine footballer who played as a midfielder for Italian Serie A club SSD Napoli Femminile. She is also a futsal player, and represented Argentina internationally in both football and futsal.

Club career
Blanco played for River Plate and Italian side Gruppo Isef.

International career
Blanco was part of the Argentina women's national football team at the 2008 Summer Olympics and the 2010 South American Women's Football Championship.

See also
 Argentina at the 2008 Summer Olympics

References

External links
 
https://femeninosoccer.wordpress.com/2016/03/23/gimena-blanco-busco-mirar-el-proyecto-del-equipo/ 
http://losandes.com.ar/article/la-mendocina-gimena-blanco-la-unica-jugadora-en-ganar-cuatro-scudettos 
http://www.gettyimages.com/photos/mar%C3%ADa-gimena-blanco?excludenudity=true&sort=mostpopular&mediatype=photography&phrase=mar%C3%ADa%20gimena%20blanco

1987 births
Living people
Sportspeople from Mendoza, Argentina
Argentine women's footballers
Women's association football midfielders
Club Atlético River Plate (women) players
Argentina women's international footballers
Olympic footballers of Argentina
Footballers at the 2008 Summer Olympics
Argentine expatriate women's footballers
Argentine expatriate sportspeople in Italy
Expatriate women's footballers in Italy
Argentine women's futsal players